Novomuslyumovo (Yañı Möslim) is a rural locality (a selo) in Bolsheustyikinsky Selsoviet, Mechetlinsky District, Bashkortostan, Russia. The population was 1,063 as of 2010. There are 7 streets.

Geography 
Novomuslyumovo is located 15 km east of Bolsheustyikinskoye (the district's administrative centre) by road. Yemashi is the nearest rural locality.

References 

Rural localities in Mechetlinsky District